Water polo was contested for men only at the 1959 Pan American Games in Chicago, United States.  It was played at the Portage Park pool.

Competing teams
Five teams contested the event.

Medalists

References

 Pan American Games water polo medalists on HickokSports

Events at the 1959 Pan American Games
1959
1959 Pan American Games
Pan American Games